Pucacocha (possibly from Quechua puka red, qucha lake, "red lake") is a  mountain in the Vilcanota mountain range in the Andes of Peru. It is situated in the Cusco Region, Quispicanchi Province, Marcapata District. Pucacocha lies northeast of Jatunñaño Punta.

References 

Mountains of Cusco Region
Mountains of Peru